Pilot Knob Station, a former stage station of the Butterfeild Overland Mail, located near Andrade, California.  It was placed 10 miles west of the Fort Yuma stage station on the road along the Colorado River, in California, and 18 miles east of the Cooke's Wells Station in Baja California.
It was subsequently used by the Union Army as station for its troops and supply wagons during the American Civil War and was a stage station again after the Civil War until the Southern Pacific Railroad, arrived in Yuma, Arizona ending the need for the stage line from California.

References

Butterfield Overland Mail in California
American frontier
Stagecoach stations in California
Transportation buildings and structures in Imperial County, California